Jahmal Harvey (born November 19, 2002) is an American amateur boxer who won a gold medal at the 2021 World Championships in the Featherweight division.

References

External links
 

Living people
2002 births
American male boxers
AIBA World Boxing Championships medalists
Featherweight boxers